This is a list of the Bulgaria national football team results from 2000 to 2019:

Results

2000

2001

2002

2003

2004

2005

2006

2007

2008

2009

2010

2011

2012

2013

2014

2015

2016

2017

2018

2019

References

External links
EU-Football - international football match results of Bulgaria 1924-present
World Referee - Matches featuring Bulgaria

Bulgaria national football team results